Kongsberg Station is a railway station located in downtown Kongsberg in Buskerud, Norway, on the Sørlandet Line. The station is served by express trains to Kristiansand and is the terminus of the L12 line from Oslo and Eidsvoll.

History

The first station at Kongsberg opened in 1871 when the branch line of the Randsfjord Line from Hokksund to Kongsberg was completed. The present station dates from 1917 with the construction of the Sørland Line and was drawn by Gudmund Hoel and N. W. Grimnes. The station was preserved by the Norwegian Directorate for Cultural Heritage in 1997.

The restaurant was taken over by Norsk Spisevognselskap in on 1 November 1944.

References

Railway stations on the Sørlandet Line
Railway stations in Buskerud
Railway stations opened in 1917
1917 establishments in Norway